Metardaris is a Neotropical genus of firetips in the family Hesperiidae. The genus is monotypic containing the single species Metardaris cosinga, present in Bolivia and Peru. M. cosingas larvae are considered a delicacy, and are known as Huaytampo' to the people of Peru.

References

Natural History Museum Lepidoptera genus database

External links
images representing Metardaris cosinga at Consortium for the Barcode of Life

Hesperiidae genera
Hesperiidae of South America
Monotypic butterfly genera